Journal of the West is a quarterly peer-reviewed academic journal covering the history and culture of the American West. Each issue of the journal is highlighted by a series of articles on a theme central to the history and life of the region. The journal is published by ABC-CLIO and, since 2004, the managing editor is Steven L. Danver.

External links 
 

History of the United States journals
History of the American West
Publications established in 1962
English-language journals
Quarterly journals